Marcus Patric (born Patrick Henry Gosling on 17 August 1979 in Gosport, Hampshire) is an English actor.

Career
Best known for the role of Ben Davies in the Channel 4 soap opera Hollyoaks, he then starred in its spin-offs Hollyoaks: Let Loose and Hollyoaks: In the City.  He won the role after entering the televised open-audition Hollyoaks: On The Pull.

After leaving Hollyoaks in 2006, Patrick has appeared twice on BBC1 lunchtime drama Doctors, and in 2008 he landed a major role in ITV1 drama Echo Beach and its spin-off show Moving Wallpaper.

Gameshows
Marcus has also appeared as a competitor on The Weakest Link, Soapstar Superchef, Strictly Ice Dancing and  Celebrity MasterChef.  He also won Total Wipeout and 71 Degrees North.

Personal life
Patrick's father died when he was seven years of age.  Patrick lives with his partner, Georgia Martin, an air hostess, and their son, Ethan (who was born on the anniversary of Patrick's father's death).

Filmography

Theatre
2011, 2012  Wildboyz
2012 Billy Liar
2015 Snow White
2016 Jack and the beanstalk, Kings Theatre Portsmouth.
2017 Snow White, Kings Theatre Portsmouth

References

External links

1979 births
Living people
Male actors from Portsmouth
People educated at Bembridge School
English male soap opera actors
1970s births